King of the Road may refer to:

Music 
 "King of the Road" (song), a 1965 song by Roger Miller
 King of the Road (album), an album by Fu Manchu
 King of the Road, an EP by The Proclaimers

Other uses 
 King of the Road (skateboarding), a contest sponsored by Thrasher magazine
 King of the Road Map Service, an American map company
 Hard Truck 2: King of the Road, the European version of the video game Hard Truck 2
 Lucas Industries#King of the Road, a brand name used for a range of bicycle equipment produced by Lucas Industries